Fine Line may refer to:

Music
 Fine Line (album), a 2019 album by Harry Styles, or its title song
 "Fine Line" (Paul McCartney song)
 "Fine Line" (Barry Gibb song)
 "Fine Line" (Little Big Town song)
 "Fine Line" (Mabel song)
 "Fine Line", a song by 10,000 Maniacs from Triangles
 "Fine Line", a song by Chumbawamba from The Boy Bands Have Won
 "Fine Line", a song by Eminem from the compilation album Shady XV
 A Fine Line, an album by Heather Rankin (singer)
 "A Fine Line", a song by Radney Foster from Del Rio, TX 1959
 "Fine Line", a cover version of Foster's song by Hootie & the Blowfish from the album Scattered, Smothered and Covered

Film and television
 Fine Line Features, division of New Line Cinema
 Fine Line, a documentary series written and directed by Ellen Fanning

Visual art
 "A Fine Line", an exhibition by Inka Essenhigh

See also
 "There's a Fine, Fine Line", a song from Avenue Q
 Fine Fine Line, an album by Andy Fraser